Greenville High School (GHS) is a 9-12 public high school located in Greenville, Michigan. GHS is part of the Greenville Public Schools district.

Demographics
The demographic breakdown of the 1,144 students enrolled in 2014-15 was:
Male - 52.9%
Female - 47.1%
Native American/Alaskan - 0%
Asian/Pacific islanders - 0.8%
Black - 1.4%
Hispanic - 4.6%
White - 92.2%
Multiracial - 1.0%

41.2% of the students were eligible for free or reduced lunch.

Athletics
The Greenville Yellow Jackets compete in the Ottawa-Kent Conference. The school colors are purple and gold. The following MHSAA sanctioned sports are offered:

Baseball (boys)
Basketball (boys & girls)
Cross country (boys & girls)
Football (boys)
Golf (boys & girls)
Soccer (boys & girls)
Softball (girls)
Tennis (boys & girls)
Track and field (boys & girls)
Volleyball (girls)
Wrestling (boys)
State champion - 2008

Notable alumni
Ty Hallock - NFL fullback
Shane Mahan - Motion picture special effects artist
Damian Matacz - Professional basketball player
Justin Zimmer - NFL defensive tackle

References

External links 

Greenville Public Schools

Schools in Montcalm County, Michigan
Public high schools in Michigan